Ali Murat Dizioğlu (born 27 September 1963) is a Turkish fencer. He competed in the individual épée event at the 1984 Summer Olympics.

References

External links
 

1963 births
Living people
Turkish male épée fencers
Olympic fencers of Turkey
Fencers at the 1984 Summer Olympics